Barbatula dgebuadzei is one of seventeen species of ray-finned fish in the genus Barbatula.

Distribution
Barbatula dgebuadzei is endemic to Mongolia.

Footnotes 

 

dgebuadzei
Fish described in 2003